Aberconwy is a constituency of the Senedd. First created for the former Assembly's 2007 election. It elects one Member of the Senedd by the first past the post method of election. It is one of nine constituencies in the North Wales electoral region, which elects four additional members, in addition to nine constituency members, to produce a degree of proportional representation for the region as a whole.

History 
Since its creation, this seat has been a three-way marginal constituency between the Conservatives, Labour and Plaid Cymru. Plaid won this seat in the 2007 election but since then the Conservatives have narrowly held the constituency.

Boundaries 

The constituency has the same boundary as the Aberconwy Westminster constituency, which came into use for the 2010 United Kingdom general election. It was created in 2007 and merges into one constituency areas formerly within the Conwy and Meirionnydd Nant Conwy constituencies. Conwy was a constituency within the North Wales electoral region, straddling the boundary between the preserved county of Clwyd and the preserved county of Gwynedd. Meirionnydd Nant Conwy also straddled this boundary, but was within the Mid and West Wales region.

Aberconwy constituency is entirely within the preserved county of Clwyd.

It is composed of the Conwy electoral divisions: Betws-y-Coed, Bryn, Caerhun, Capelulo, Conwy, Craig-y-Don, Crwst, Deganwy, Egwysbach, Gogarth, Gower, Llansanffraid, Marl, Mostyn, Pandy, Penmaenan, Penrhyn, Pensarn, Trefriw, Tudno, and Uwch Conwy.

The North Wales region was created for the first Assembly election, in 1999. For the 2007 election, however, it had new boundaries. It includes the constituencies of Aberconwy, Alyn and Deeside, Arfon, Clwyd South, Clwyd West, Delyn, Vale of Clwyd, Wrexham and Ynys Môn.

Voting 
In general elections for the Senedd, each voter has two votes. The first vote may be used to vote for a candidate to become the Member of the Senedd for the voter's constituency, elected by the first past the post system. The second vote may be used to vote for a regional closed party list of candidates. Additional member seats are allocated from the lists by the d'Hondt method, with constituency results being taken into account in the allocation.

Members of the Senedd

Elections

Elections in the 2020s

Elections in the 2010s 

Regional ballots rejected: 162

Elections in the 2000s

References 

Senedd constituencies in the North Wales electoral region
2007 establishments in Wales
Constituencies established in 2007